The golden-sided euphonia (Euphonia cayennensis) is a species of bird in the family Fringillidae.
It is found in northern Brazil, French Guiana, Guyana, Suriname and eastern Venezuela.
Its natural habitat is subtropical or tropical moist lowland forest.

References

golden-sided euphonia
Birds of the Guianas
golden-sided euphonia
golden-sided euphonia
Taxonomy articles created by Polbot